Saint Helen (abbreviated St. Helen and St Helen) may refer to:

People 
 Saint Helen of Constantinople, title for Helena (empress) (c. 250 – c. 330), mother of Constantine the Great
 Saint Helen of Caernarfon or Saint Elen, late 4th-century founder of churches in Wales
 Saint Helen of Serbia, medieval Queen of Serbia, died in 1314
 Saint Helen of Sinope (live during the 1700s), Eastern Orthodox virgin martyr.

Places 
 Saint-Hélen, commune in the Côtes-d'Armor departement, France
 St. Helen, Michigan, unincorporated community in Roscommon County, Michigan, United States 
 Lake St. Helen, lake at St. Helen, Michigan
 St Helen Auckland, village in County Durham, England
 Church of St Helen, St Helen Auckland, Anglican church
 St Helen Without, civil parish in Oxfordshire, England
 St Helen's Basilica, church in Birkirkara, Malta

Other 
 MV St Helen, ferry formerly at the Isle of Wight, now in Sardinia, Italy

See also
 Helen (disambiguation)
 St Helens (disambiguation)
 St Helena (disambiguation)
 Sainte-Hélène (disambiguation)
 Santa Helena (disambiguation)